Susan's Plan (also released as Dying to Get Rich on video) is a 1998 American black comedy film written and directed by John Landis and starring Nastassja Kinski, Dan Aykroyd, Billy Zane, Rob Schneider, Lara Flynn Boyle and Michael Biehn. The plot revolves around Susan (Kinski)'s plan to kill her former husband (with the help of a group of misfits) and collect his life insurance.

The film was screened at the AFI Film Festival in 1998 but due to poor audience reactions, Susan's Plan was released straight to video in 2000.

Plot

Susan Holland is a suburbanite woman who plots to kill her wealthy husband Paul in order to collect his life insurance policy. Through Susan's adulterous lover, Sam Meyers, she hires two incompetent criminals, named Bill and Steve, to kill Paul and make it look like a mugging gone wrong. However, when Bill and Steve show up as expected and shoot Paul outside his car in a parking lot, Paul survives and is taken to the hospital. Undaunted, Susan insists on continuing with her plans to kill Paul by having hiring a biker, named Bob, to carry out the deed while Paul is recovering in the hospital. Bob enlists a former prostitute, named Betty Johnson, to seduce Dr. Chris Stillman, the doctor treating Paul, to have the doctor move Paul to a private hospital room for Bob to isolate and kill Paul.

However, Susan's plan starts to unravel when a suspicious police detective, Detective Scott, begins suspecting her of having a hand in the attempt on Paul's life, and Sam's ex-wife, Penny, learns about the plot and wants in on part of Paul's life insurance money. Both Bill and Steve continue to insist to Susan to pay them for their work anyway despite they failed to kill Paul as planned. All through the film are fantasy sequences from various characters of their fears over being caught or shot by their own accomplices as details of the plan to kill Paul begins to fall apart.

Despite circumstances, Bob does manage to sneak into Paul's hospital room and kills him by smothering him with a pillow and makes a quick getaway. However, the next day, as Susan and Sam are planning to go to the police station to give their statement and pay off Bill and Steve for their work, Detective Scott and several policemen arrive and arrest all of them when security cameras at the hospital captured all of the events leading up to Paul's murder. When Bob arrives at Susan's house and the police move into arrest him, he attempts to run and opens fire at the policemen, but gets shot and killed trying to escape. Steve is shot and killed by a stray bullet in the crossfire. Susan is taken away to jail, while Sam's ex-wife Penny is also arrested due to her knowledge of the plot. Only Betty manages to slip away.

In the final scene, with Susan, Sam, Bill, and Penny all in prison serving their time, and the bodies of Bob, Steve, and Paul at the local morgue, Betty is shown to be living in Las Vegas in the free and clear and working as a casino cocktail waitress. When Dr. Stillman happens to visit the casino with his wife while on vacation, he spots and recognizes Betty working there under her new alias and knows that she had a hand in Paul's murder. But Dr. Stillman, fearing a negative reaction from his wife if she learned about his brief sexual tryst with Betty, pretends not to know who Betty is and lets her go while he continues his holiday in Vegas with his wife.

Cast
Nastassja Kinski as Susan Holland
Billy Zane as Sam Meyers
Dan Aykroyd as Bob
Michael Biehn as Bill
Rob Schneider as Steve
Lara Flynn Boyle as Betty Johnson
Thomas Haden Church as Dr. Chris Stillman
Bill Duke as Detective Scott
Lisa Edelstein as Penny Meyers
Sheree North as Mrs. Beyers
Adrian Paul as Paul Holland
Adam Rifkin as Gambler #1
Danny Huston as Gambler #2

External links 
 
 
 

1998 films
1990s black comedy films
1990s crime comedy films
1998 independent films
American black comedy films
American crime comedy films
American independent films
Films directed by John Landis
Films produced by John Landis
Films set in hospitals
Films with screenplays by John Landis
1998 comedy films
Mariticide in fiction
The Kushner-Locke Company films
1990s English-language films
1990s American films